Ioan Sandu Sturdza or Ioniță Sandu Sturdza (1762 – 2 February 1842) was a ruler (hospodar) (List of Moldavian rulers) of Moldavia from 21 June 1822 to 5 May 1828.

Biography

Sturdza is considered the first indigenous ruler with the end of Phanariote rule (as a move the Ottoman Empire undertook after seeing the political disadvantages of Greek domination after the troubles in the Greek War of Independence).

Immediately after the Greek revolution, Prince Ioan Sturdza took an active part in subduing the roving bands of Eterists in Moldavia; he transformed the Greek language elementary schools into Romanian language ones and laid the foundation for that scientific national development which Prince Mihai Sturdza continued after 1834, especially after his founding of an upper school in the Trei Ierarhi Cathedral complex in Iași. Although his project for the confiscation of some Church properties was initially blocked by Russia, Sturdza opted not to revise his position.

Opposed by the boyars who had taken refuge in Imperial Russia during Ypsilanti's military rule, and threatened with the loss of his throne after the 1826 Russo-Turkish Akkerman Convention that established a seven-year term in office for Princes elected by the Sfatul boieresc (confirmed by the Ottomans, with Russia's approval), Sturdza agreed to many boyar demands, including tax cuts and exemptions from conscription. However, he ensured meritocratic criteria in access to public offices. At the same time, a conflict became apparent between high- and low-ranking boyars, after the proposed constitution of Ionică Tăutu was rejected by most of the former (a vocal minority under the leadership of Mihail Sturdza). In 1828, the Russians entered the country during the  Russo-Turkish War of 1828-29 and took Prince Ioan prisoner. He died while being kept in Bessarabia and was later buried in Iași.

Marriage and issue
He married Princess Ecaterina Rossetti-Roznoveanu (1764-1847). They had:

Prince Nicolae 
 Princess Maria Ghika-Comanesti (1805-1887), their daughter Princess Pulcheria (1831-1874) became mother of Queen Natalie of Serbia and grandmother of King Alexander I of Serbia.

See also
 Sturdza family

Notes

References
 

Rulers of Moldavia
Moldavian people of the Greek War of Independence
Ioan
Year of birth missing
Place of birth missing
Year of death missing
Place of death missing